Watertown Masonic Temple is a historic Masonic building located in Watertown in Jefferson County, New York. It was constructed in 1914 as a meeting hall for a local Masonic lodge. and is a three-story, Neoclassical style rectangular, masonry and steel structure. The front of the building features a large prostyle temple front with six columns in the Doric order supporting a triangular pediment.

It was listed on the National Register of Historic Places in 1980
In 2003, the Masonic Hall Association decided to sell the building, citing the cost of maintaining the structure, and declining membership for its decision.

A plan to renovate the building as a performing arts center is included in a ten million dollar New York State Empire State Development Corporation revitalization grant.

References

External links

Clubhouses on the National Register of Historic Places in New York (state)
Masonic buildings completed in 1914
Former Masonic buildings in New York (state)
National Register of Historic Places in Watertown, New York